Ali Asgar is an Indian actor and stand-up comedian. He has appeared in many Indian TV serials and movies. Asgar appeared as Kamal Agarwal in Star Plus TV show Kahaani Ghar Ghar Ki. He also appeared in SAB TV's show F.I.R. as Inspector Raj Aryan. He is commonly known for his role in Colors TV show Comedy Nights with Kapil as Dadi.

Filmography

Films

Television

Dubbing roles

Animated films

Awards

References

External links
 

Living people
Indian stand-up comedians
Male actors from Mumbai
Year of birth missing (living people)
Male actors from Pune
Male actors in Hindi cinema
Male actors in Hindi television